WASP-11/HAT-P-10 is a binary star. It is a primary main-sequence orange dwarf star. The system is located about 424 light-years away in the constellation Aries.

Planetary system
A semi-Jovian planet, WASP-11b/HAT-P-10b (WASP-11 A b/HAT-P-10 A b), was detected around the primary star independently by the Hungarian Automated Telescope Network and the Wide Angle Search for Planets teams, both of which used the transit method.

See also
 HATNet Project, or HAT
 SuperWASP, or SWASP

References

External links
 

Planetary systems with one confirmed planet
K-type main-sequence stars
Aries (constellation)
Planetary transit variables
Binary stars
J03092855+3040249
11